Petrochori (Greek: Πετροχώρι)  may refer to several places in Greece:

Petrochori, Achaea, a village in Achaea 
Petrochori, Aetolia-Acarnania, a village in the municipal unit Thermo, Aetolia-Acarnania 
Petrochori, Karditsa, a village in the municipal unit Athamanes, Karditsa regional unit 
Petrochori, a village in the community Romanos, Messenia 
Petrochori, Rethymno, a village in the municipal unit Kourites, Rethymno regional unit 
Petrochori, Trikala, a village in the municipal unit Pyli, Trikala regional unit
Petrochori, a village in the community Evmoiro, Xanthi regional unit